Helcystogramma uedai is a moth in the family Gelechiidae. It was described by Rose and Pathania in 2003. It is endemic to India.

References

Moths described in 2003
uedai
Moths of Asia